Königstrasse or Königstraße is the German word for "King Street".

Things named Königstrasse include:
Königstrasse (Königsberg)
Königstrasse station, Hamburg
, main shopping street of Stuttgart, Germany

German words and phrases